Homebrew is the second studio album by Swedish musician Neneh Cherry. It was released in 1992 via Circa Records. The album features several different genres, including between jazz, funk and trip hop. The album photography was by Jean-Baptiste Mondino.

Recording sessions took place at Cherry Bear Studios in London and at the Cherry Bear Mobile, except "Sassy" was additionally recorded at Grapehouse Studios in Copenhagen and "Trout" was additionally recorded at Power Play Studios in New York.

Gang Starr co-wrote and produced "Sassy" and "I Ain't Gone Under Yet". Geoff Barrow wrote and produced "Somedays".

"Trout" features a guitar riff replayed by Jonny Dollar from Steppenwolf's version of "The Pusher", and the drum track by John Bonham from "When the Levee Breaks". "Buddy X" was allegedly inspired by Lenny Kravitz. It was later remixed by Falcon & Fabian and featured Notorious B.I.G. and also remixed by the Dreem Teem and Masters at Work. The track "Move with Me" later appeared on the soundtrack of the 1993 film Sliver, while a dub version of the song appears on the soundtrack of the 1991 Wim Wenders film Until the End of the World. The track 'Red Paint' is a reinterpretation of a true story told to Neneh by her late mother Moki Cherry.

Track listing

Charts

References

External links

1992 albums
Neneh Cherry albums
Albums produced by Guru
Albums produced by DJ Premier
Albums produced by Geoff Barrow
Albums produced by Cameron McVey